Wea Township is one of thirteen townships in Tippecanoe County, Indiana, United States. As of the 2010 census, its population was 31,660 and it contained 13,022 housing units.

Geography

Cities, towns, villages
 Lafayette (south quarter)

Unincorporated communities
 North Crane at 
 South Raub at 
(This list is based on USGS data and may include former settlements.)

Adjacent townships
 Fairfield Township (north)
 Perry Township (northeast)
 Sheffield Township (east)
 Lauramie Township (southeast)
 Randolph Township (southwest)
 Union Township (west)

Cemeteries
The township contains these cemeteries: Conarroe, Fink, Kenny, Meadow View, O'Neall, Provault, Shoemaker, Sickler, Spring Grove and Wildcat.

Major highways
  US Route 52
  US Route 231
  Indiana State Road 25

School districts
 Lafayette School Corporation
 Tippecanoe School Corporation

Political districts
 Indiana's 4th congressional district
 State House District 26
 State House District 27
 State House District 41
 State Senate District 22

References
 United States Census Bureau 2007 TIGER/Line Shapefiles
 United States Board on Geographic Names (GNIS)
 United States National Atlas

External links
 Indiana Township Association
 United Township Association of Indiana

Townships in Tippecanoe County, Indiana
Lafayette metropolitan area, Indiana
Townships in Indiana